The Southern Quarterly is a peer-reviewed academic journal published by the University of Southern Mississippi that focuses on Southern arts and culture. One of the oldest journals dedicated to scholarship about the American south, it debuted in 1962 and is available via Project MUSE.

References

External links

 

Cultural journals
University of Southern Mississippi
Publications established in 1962
English-language journals